Louise de Maisonblanche (17 June 1676 – 12 September 1718), was a French noblewoman, the illegitimate daughter of Louis XIV, King of France and his mistress, Claude de Vin des Œillets. She became the Baroness of La Queue by her marriage to Bernard de Prez.

Life

Early life 

Louise de Maisonblanche was born on 17 June 1676 in Paris to Claude de Vin des Œillets, Mademoiselle des Œillets (1637–1687), the maid of honour (demoiselle de compagnie) or chambermaid (femme de chambre) of Françoise-Athénaïs de Rochechouart, Marquise of Montespan (1640 –1707). Madame de Montespan had been the maîtresse-en-titre (official mistress) of Louis XIV, King of France (1638–1715) for 9 years, during which he had relationships with other women as well, including Mademoiselle des Œillets. She was officially recorded as the daughter of former cavalry captain Philippe de Maisonblanche and his wife, born Lady Gabrielle de La Tour.

As Maisonblanche's mother was known to have had several lovers, the king always doubted her paternity, even after she had reportedly grown up to closely resemble him. He never recognised or legitimised her, and treated her poorly as an adult.

She was brought up in Paris by her mother and did not receive the same attention that the king's other illegitimate children (by Louise de La Vallière and Madame de Montespan) did. For a while, she lived at the Castle of Suisnes, where her mother died in 1687. She was then placed in the care of siblings François and Catherine Le Signerre in Mulcent.

Marriage and later life 
Maisonblanche remained in Mulcent with the Le Signerres until the age of 20. On 17 April 1696, she married Bernard de Prez, Baron of La Queue, lieutenant of the regiment of Burgundy. The wedding's organisation was overseen by Alexandre Bontemps (1626–1701), first valet of the king's bedchamber (premier valet de la chambre du roi), who secured a dowry of 40 000 livres, silver, and jewels for the bride. This was close to nothing compared to the dowries of her legitimised half-sisters: when Marie-Anne de Bourbon (1666–1739) married in 1680, she received 1 million livres. So did Louise-Françoise de Bourbon in 1685, while Françoise-Marie de Bourbon (1677–1749) received 2 million livres and the Palais-Royal.

Later,[when?] was appointed a member of the Gardes du Corps (Life Guards). As an adult, which allowed her to visit the Palace of Versailles, but she never frequented the court. She only ever went outside veiled in order to avoid scandals. She had 11 children by her husband, 6 of whom survived infancy. On their birth certificates, she was recorded as Dame Louise de Bourbon-Maisonblanche, fille naturelle du Roi ("Lady Louise of Bourbon-Maisonblanche, natural daughter of the King"). Two of her daughters, Charlotte-Angélique (1703–1723) and Louise-Catherine (1709–1756) attended the Maison royale de Saint-Louis in Saint-Cyr, Madame de Maintenon's boarding school for daughters of the nobility. In their school records, they were called petite-filles du Roi ("granddaughters of the King"). 

She died of smallpox on 12 September 1718 at La Queue-les-Yvelines.

Issue

Louise de Maisonblanche had 11 children by her husband, Bernard de Prez, Baron of La Queue, 6 of whom survived to adulthood:
Louise-Renée de Prez (Montfort l'Amaury, 27 October 1699 – 1705), died at the age of 6;
Louis-Bernard de Prez (born and died Montfort l'Amaury, 17 March 1701), stillborn;
Charlotte-Angélique de Prez (Montfort l'Amaury, 11 October 1703 – 1723), died of hypothermia at the age of 19 or 20 after falling into a lake;
Louis-Charles-Timothée de Prez (14 October 1704 – 1746), married Madeleine-Marguerite-Charlotte Soulaigre des Fossés and died after falling from a horse;
A son, maybe Stanislas-Henri de Prez (born and died Montfort l'Amaury, 4 September 1706), stillborn;
Alexandre-Paul-Cyr de Prez (Montfort l'Amaury, 5 August 1708 – Neauphle le Vieux, 8 October 1777), first married Marie-Jeanne de Malebranche on 3 February 1755, then Claude-Marguerite Le Cousturier du Meny in 1763; 
Louise-Catherine de Prez (La Queue-les-Yvelines, 16 June 1709 – 1756), married Timothée de Vaultier de Petitmont on 10 October 1745.
Françoise de Prez (5 January 1711 – 1715), died of scarlet fever at the age of 3 or 4;
Guillaume-Jacques de Prez (Gallais, 15 November 1713 – La Queue les Yvelines, 5 October 1804), married Françoise Perrette Le Bœuf in 1754
Marguerite-Françoise de Prez (Gallins-la-Queue, 15 May 1715 – Montfort l'Amaury, 1786);
Philippe-Charles de Prez (Gallins-la-Queue, 8 August 1718 – February 1719), died at the age of 6 months

References 

1676 births
1718 deaths
People from Paris
Deaths from smallpox
17th-century French women
18th-century French women
French baronesses
Illegitimate children of French monarchs
Illegitimate children of Louis XIV
Daughters of kings